Lānaihale is a mountain peak in Hawaii. It is the highest point of the island of Lanai.

References

Mountains of Hawaii
Landforms of Lanai